London Buses route 312 is a Transport for London contracted bus route in London, England. Running between South Croydon garage and Norwood Junction station, it is operated by Arriva London.

History

Route 312 became the first route in London to be operated exclusively by electric buses, when Arriva London commenced a further contract on 5 September 2015 with Optare MetroCitys.

Current route
Route 312 operates via these primary locations:
South Croydon garage
Croydon High Street
East Croydon station  
Addiscombe tram stop 
Woodside tram stop 
Norwood Junction station

References

External links

Bus routes in London
Transport in the London Borough of Croydon